The F1600 Championship Series was created by the SCCA in 2011. The series is organized by Formula Race Promotions, the same organization which organizes the F2000 Championship Series, and sanctioned by SCCA Pro Racing. It is a series whose champion is eligible for the Road to Indy Shootout provided the driver is of an eligible age, and has the necessary skills to operate such machine.

The Series

The class operates under the same rules as the SCCA Formula F. Therefore, many drivers from the local club racing scene make their appearance in the national series.

2011 Season

The first year saw many club racers and well established constructors racing in the series. Most cars were Van Diemen, Piper or Swift. Cape Motorsports began a collaboration with the Australian constructor Spectrum. Spectrum had already many years of Formula Ford experience in Australia. This also saw the introduction of Australian driver Mitch Martin who raced 2 races and scored a pole position and 2 second-place finishes. Volkswagen Jetta Cup graduate Wyatt Gooden made four appearances and scored 4 wins, this placed him sixth in the championship. Gooden went on to race in the F2000 Championship Series and USF2000. Bill Valet, who went on to win the inaugural championship, scored two wins but with seven podium finishes he outscored Tim Kautz (second) and Jim Goughary, Jr. (third).

2012 Season

2012 saw the addition of Bryan Herta Autosport with drivers Brandon Newey and Canadian Garett Grist. Bryan Herta Autosport became the official importer of Mygale cars in the United States. This saw the introduction of the Mygale SJ12 in the F1600 Championship Series. Brandon Newey went on to win four races and score a second place in the championship. Cape Motorsports won the drivers championship with Finnish Formula Ford graduate Matias Köykkä. Köykkä won four races but due to more fastest race laps he won the championship over Newey.  Australian Shae Davies, teammate of Köykkä, won three races out of six entries. A total of 46 drivers entered the 2012 season.

2013 Season

Carbir was to return in Formula F as a constructor with a factory entry. The Carbir was to be driven by SCCA Formula Ford stand out Reid Hazelton but was unable to enter any races in 2013.  It is assumed financial setbacks hampered the Carbir factory. The season starts 13 April.

2013 also sees the introduction of a 'Masters' class. The Masters class will be available for drivers that are 40 years old and up.

Cars

All standard Formula Ford cars are allowed into the series. Due to rule changes in Formula Ford across Europe in early 2012 the F1600 Championship Series had to act. They acted in a way which allowed the Formula Ford Duratec car, when Ford Kent powered, into the series. Alongside the Van Diemen, Mygale and other cars there are also privately manufactured Formula Ford cars allowed like the 'Wiver'. Before the year 2011 the SCCA only allowed the Ford Kent engine in Formula Ford. As of 2011 the Honda Fit engine is allowed in the renamed Formula F.

Champions

See also
2022 F1600 Championship Series

References

External links
 F1600 Championship Series

 
Sports Car Club of America
Recurring sporting events established in 2011